The Mississippi River is a tributary of the Ottawa River in Eastern Ontario, Canada which has no relation with the Mississippi River in the United States. There are more than 250 lakes in the watershed.

Communities along the river include the village of Lanark, the towns of Carleton Place, Mississippi Mills (including towns of Almonte and Pakenham), and Galetta. Here it enters the Ottawa River.

Etymology
The origin of the river's name is something of a mystery; although its current spelling may be derived from that of its much larger American cousin, it is most certainly a corruption of a different indigenous name, as the translation 'great water' would not apply to a relatively minor tributary of the Ottawa, definitely the largest river in the area. Instead, the name may originate from "Mazinaa[bikinigan]-ziibi", Algonquian for '[painted] image river', referring to the pictographs found on Mazinaw Lake, though this is by no means proven.

Description
From its headwaters at Mackavoy Lake to its confluence at the Ottawa River near Fitzroy Harbour, the river drops  in elevation. It begins on the Canadian Shield (mostly gneiss and marble), and then, after Carleton Place, flows through limestone and clay plains. At Carleton Place, there are rapids with limestone cliffs.  This area supports the largest stand of hackberry trees in the region.

Most of the upper landscape is temperate deciduous forest dominated by sugar maple, American beech, and red oak. At one time, the forests had much more eastern hemlock, but this was logged out to produce bark for the tanning industry.  Now, large hemlock stands are uncommon. Most forests are less than a century old.

The irregular terrain of the upper watershed is produced by the remnants of an ancient mountain chain, the Grenville Mountains, which arose on the supercontinent of Rodinia more than a billion years ago. These mountains have since been eroded to mostly gneiss and marble hills, with occasional outcrops of granite. Lower in the watershed, there are younger limestone rocks.  Most of these are covered by clay deposited when this area was covered by the Champlain Sea.

Occasional large wetlands occur along the river. One of the largest is the Innisville Wetlands, a provincially significant wetland that is also designated an Area of Natural and Scientific Interest. Another large wetland is the Appleton Silver Maple Swamp. These wetlands depend upon the seasonal cycles of the river.  High water periods in the spring flood large areas creating wetland soils and large areas of marsh. As water levels slowly fall, conditions suitable for swamp forests occur. This natural seasonal alternation between high and lower water levels is essential for creating the natural diversity of wetlands along the river.

Upstream, in Lanark County, there are two sections of the river that are important for their plant communities. The first section of interest includes the east end of Dalhousie Lake and the swamp- and marsh-lined portion of the Mississippi River from the lake almost to Sheridans Rapids. Shallow lakes and adjacent river make up the provincially significant McCullochs Mud Lake Wetland. The second portion of interest is the rocky, rapid-filled section of the river from Sheridans Rapids down to just past Playfairville. Here there are small populations of unusual species including Parnassia glauca (Grass-of-parnassus), Platanthera flava (Tubercled Orchid) and Spiranthes lucida (Shining Ladies'-tresses).

Downstream, where the Mississippi enters the Ottawa River, there are several important shorelines and wetlands, including the Mississippi Snye, which has a rich aquatic flora over marble bedrock, and has recorded observations for the musk turtle.

The river originally powered textile mills. Today, it provides hydroelectric power. Such power dams, however, have all but eliminated American eels from the river. These eels were once an abundant source of food for aboriginal populations, as well as providing a source of food for great blue herons, otters, and other animals.

There are many important natural areas along the river. Purdon Conservation Area supports Canada's largest native colony of showy lady slipper orchids, comprising about 16,000 plants. The Carleton Place Hackberry stand, and the Innisville Wetlands, have both been mentioned above. In drier areas, there are several provincially significant alvars, limestone plains with exposed rock and many rare plants. These include the Burnt Lands Alvar and the Panmure Alvar.

The river has a surprising diversity of turtles, including painted turtles, snapping turtles, Blanding's turtles, musk turtles and map turtles. The last four are considered species at risk, probably because nesting beaches have been degraded by human settlement.

Tributaries
 Clyde River
 Indian River
 Fall River
 Bell's Creek

See also
List of Ontario rivers

References

External links

 Mississippi Valley Conservation
 Ottawa-Gatineau Watershed Atlas
 The Mississippi Valley Field Naturalists

Rivers of Lennox and Addington County
Rivers of Lanark County